Marin County  is a county located in the northwestern part of the San Francisco Bay Area of the U.S. state of California. As of the 2020 census, the population was 262,231. Its county seat and largest city is San Rafael. Marin County is across the Golden Gate Bridge from San Francisco, and is included in the San Francisco–Oakland–Berkeley, CA Metropolitan Statistical Area.

Marin County's natural sites include the Muir Woods redwood forest, the Marin Headlands, Stinson Beach, the Point Reyes National Seashore, and Mount Tamalpais. As of 2019, Marin County had the sixth highest income per capita of all U.S. counties, at $141,735. The county is governed by the Marin County Board of Supervisors.

The Marin County Civic Center was designed by Frank Lloyd Wright and draws thousands of visitors a year to guided tours of its arch and atrium design. In 1994, a new county jail facility was embedded into the hillside nearby. 

The United States' oldest cross country running event, the Dipsea Race, takes place annually in Marin County, attracting thousands of athletes.  Modern Mountain biking has many early origins on the slopes of Mount Tamalpais in Marin. 
San Quentin State Prison is located in the county.

History

Native American settlement 

Thousands of years ago, Coast Miwok people first populated the area today known as Marin County. 

In 1770, Coast Miwok population ranged from 1,500 to 2,000, with about 600 village sites throughout the county.

In 1967, the Marin Museum of the American Indian was established, with exhibits focusing on Coast Miwok artifacts, crafts, and artwork. As of 2021, Indigenous-led events include healing drumming, dogbane cordage demonstrations, trade feasts, and traditional dancing.

American colonization 
During the Mexican-American war, areas of Marin County were seized by Americans as part of the invasion of California (1846–1847). Marin County is one of the original 27 counties of California, created February 18, 1850, following adoption of the California Constitution of 1849 and just months before the state was admitted to the Union.

According to General Mariano Vallejo, who headed an 1850 committee to name California's counties, the county was named for "Marin," great chief of the tribe Licatiut." Marin had been named "Huicmuse" until he was baptized as "Marino" at about age 20. Marin / Marino was born into the Huimen people, a Coast Miwok tribe of Native Americans who inhabited the San Rafael area. Vallejo believed that "Chief Marin" had waged several fierce battles against the Spanish. Marino definitely did reside at Mission Dolores (in modern San Francisco) much of the time from his 1801 baptism and marriage until 1817, frequently serving as a baptism witness and godfather; he may have escaped and been recaptured at some point during that time. Starting in 1817, he served as an alcalde (in effect, an overseer) at the San Rafael Mission, where he lived from 1817 off and on until his death. In 1821, Marino served as an expedition guide for the Spanish for a couple of years before escaping and hiding out for some months in the tiny Marin Islands (also named after him); his recapture resulted in a yearlong incarceration at the Presidio before his return to the Mission San Rafael area for about 15 years until his death in 1839. In 2009, a plaque commemorating Chief Marin was placed in Mill Valley.

Another version of the origin of the county name is that the bay between San Pedro Point and San Quentin Point was named Bahía de Nuestra Señora del Rosario la Marinera in 1775, and that Marin is simply an abbreviation of this name.

Francis Drake and the crew of the Golden Hind was thought to have landed on the Marin coast in 1579 claiming the land as Nova Albion. A bronze plaque inscribed with Drake's claim to the new lands, fitting the description in Drake's own account, was discovered in 1933. This so-called Drake's Plate of Brass was revealed as a hoax in 2003.

In 1595, Sebastian Cermeno lost his ship, the San Agustin, while exploring the Marin Coast. The Spanish explorer Vizcaíno landed about twenty years after Drake in what is now called Drakes Bay. However the first Spanish settlement in Marin was not established until 1817 when Mission San Rafael Arcángel was founded partly in response to the Russian-built Fort Ross to the north in what is now Sonoma County. 
Mission San Rafael Arcángel was founded in what is now downtown San Rafael as the 20th Spanish mission in the colonial Mexican province of Alta California by four priests, Father Narciso Duran from Mission San Jose, Father Abella from Mission San Francisco de Asís, Father Gil y Taboada and Father Mariano Payeras, the President of the Missions, on December 14, 1817, four years before Mexico gained independence from Spain.

Geography
It is the fourth-smallest county in California by land area. According to the records at the County Assessor-Recorder's Office, as of June 2006, Marin had  of taxable land, consisting of 79,086 parcels with a total tax basis of $39.8 billion. These parcels are divided into the following classifications:

Geographically, the county forms a large, southward-facing peninsula, with the Pacific Ocean to the west, San Pablo Bay, and San Francisco Bay to the east, and – across the Golden Gate – the city of San Francisco to the south. Marin County's northern border is with Sonoma County.

Most of the county's population resides on the eastern side, with a string of communities running along U.S. Route 101 and the San Francisco Bay, from Sausalito to Tiburon to Corte Madera to San Rafael and Novato. The interior contains large areas of agricultural and open space; West Marin, through which State Route 1 runs alongside the California coast, contains many small unincorporated communities whose economies depend on agriculture and tourism. West Marin has beaches which are popular destinations for surfers and tourists year-round.

Notable features of the shoreline along the San Francisco Bay include the Sausalito shoreline, Richardson Bay, the Tiburon Peninsula, Ring Mountain, and Triangle Marsh at Corte Madera. Further north lies San Quentin State Prison along the San Rafael shoreline.

Adjacent counties
 Sonoma County – north
 San Francisco – south

National protected areas
 Golden Gate National Recreation Area (part)
 Marin Islands National Wildlife Refuge
 Muir Woods National Monument
 Point Reyes National Seashore
 San Pablo Bay National Wildlife Refuge (part)
 Gulf of the Farallones National Marine Sanctuary (part)

State and local protected areas
The Marin County Department of Parks and Open Space manages numerous county parks and open spaces, including Stafford Lake County Park. The Marin Municipal Water District has  of trails.

State parks
 Angel Island State Park
 China Camp State Park
 Mount Tamalpais State Park
 Olompali State Historic Park
 Samuel P. Taylor State Park
 Tomales Bay State Park

Marine Protected Areas of Marin County
Like underwater parks, these marine-protected areas help conserve ocean wildlife and marine ecosystems:

 Estero Americano State Marine Recreational Management Area
 Estero de San Antonio State Marine Recreational Management Area
 Point Reyes State Marine Reserve & Point Reyes State Marine Conservation Area
 Estero de Limantour State Marine Reserve & Drakes Estero State Marine Conservation Area
 Duxbury Reef State Marine Conservation Area

Ecology

Marin County is considered in the California Floristic Province, a zone of extremely high biodiversity and endemism. There are numerous ecosystems present, including Coastal Strand, oak woodland, mixed evergreen forest, and Coast Redwood Forests chaparral and riparian zones. There are also a considerable number of protected plant and animal species present: Fauna include the California red-legged frog (Rana aurora draytonii) and California freshwater shrimp while flora include Marin Dwarf Flax, Hesperolinon congestum; Tiburon Jewelflower, Streptanthus niger; and Tiburon Indian paintbrush, Castilleja neglecta.

A number of watersheds exist in Marin County, including Walker Creek, Lagunitas Creek, Miller Creek, and Novato Creek.

Notably, the Lagunitas Creek Watershed is home to the largest remaining wild run of coho salmon (Oncorhynchus kisutch) in Central California. These coho are part of the "Central California Coast Evolutionarily Significant Unit, " or CCC ESU, and are listed as "endangered" at both the state and federal level.

Significant efforts to protect and restore these fish have been underway in the Watershed since the 1980s. Fifty percent of historical salmon habitat is now behind dams. Strong efforts are also being made to protect and restore undammed, headwater reaches of this Watershed in the San Geronimo Valley, where upwards of 40% of the Lagunitas salmon spawn each year and where as much as 1/3 of the juvenile salmon (or fry) spend their entire freshwater lives. The "Salmon Protection and Watershed Network" leads winter tours for the public to learn about and view these spawning salmon, and also leads year-round opportunities for the public to get involved in stream restoration, monitoring spawning and smolt outmigration, juvenile fish rescue and relocation in the summer, and advocacy and policy development. Around 490 different species of birds have been observed in Marin County.

Despite the lack of rain in the Marin County area due to historic drought levels, in 2014, an estimated 20,000 juvenile Coho salmon made the migration from their spawning grounds in the Lagunitas Creek area to the Pacific Ocean. This increase in migration was significantly up from the previous historic record for the same migration measured in 2006 at 11,000.

In 2010, all of the county's beaches were listed as the cleanest in the state.

When Richard Henry Dana, Jr. visited San Francisco Bay in 1835, he wrote about vast tule elk (Cervus canadensis nannodes) herds near the Golden Gate on December 27: "...we came to anchor near the mouth of the bay, under a high and beautifully sloping hill, upon which herds of hundreds and hundreds of red deer [note: "red deer" is the European term for "elk"], and the stag, with his high branching antlers, were bounding about...," although it is not clear whether this was the Marin side or the San Francisco side.

Demographics

2020 census

Note: the US Census treats Hispanic/Latino as an ethnic category. This table excludes Latinos from the racial categories and assigns them to a separate category. Hispanics/Latinos can be of any race.

2011

Places by population, race, and income

2010 Census
The 2010 United States Census reported that Marin County had a population of 252,409. The racial makeup of Marin County was 201,963 (80.0%) White, 6,987 (2.8%) African American, 1,523 (0.6%) Native American, 13,761 (5.5%) Asian, 509 (0.2%) Pacific Islander, 16,973 (6.7%) from other races, and 10,693 (4.2%) from two or more races. Hispanic or Latino of any race were 39,069 persons (15.5%).

2000
As of the census of 2000, there were 247,289 people, 100,650 households, and 60,691 families residing in the county. There were 104,990 housing units at an average density of 202 per square mile (78/km2). The racial makeup of the county was 84.0% White, 2.9% Black or African American, 0.4% Native American, 4.5% Asian, 0.2% Pacific Islander, 4.5% from other races, and 3.5% from two or more races. 11.1% of the population were Hispanic or Latino of any race.

In 2000, there were 100,650 households, out of which 27.5% had children under the age of 18 living with them, 48.4% were married couples living together, 8.5% had a female householder with no husband present, and 39.7% were non-families. 29.8% of all households were made up of individuals, and 9.6% had someone living alone who was 65 years of age or older. The average household size was 2.34 and the average family size was 2.90.

In the county, the population was spread out, with 20.3% under the age of 18, 5.5% from 18 to 24, 31.0% from 25 to 44, 29.7% from 45 to 64, and 13.5% who were 65 years of age or older. The median age was 41 years. For every 100 females there were 98.2 males. For every 100 females age 18 and over, there were 96.4 males.

Life expectancy
According to the most recent data on U.S. life expectancy, published in 2010 by the Institute for Health Metrics and Evaluation, a female in Marin County could expect to live 85.0 years, the longest for any county in the United States. The national average is 80.8 years for a female.

Race and ethnicity
According to the 2010 United States Census, the racial composition of Marin County was as follows:

 White: 72.8% (non-Hispanic)
 Hispanic or Latino (of any race): 15.5%
 Asian: 5.4%
 Two or more races: 2.9%
 Black: 2.6% (non-Hispanic)
 Native American: 0.2%
 Pacific Islander: 0.2%
 Other: 0.4%

Religion
 Roman Catholic: 31.16%
 Protestant: 6.38%
 Mormon: 1.04%
 Other Christian: 1.36%
 Judaism: 1.8%
 Eastern religions: 1.33%
 Islam: 0.44%
 No religion: 56.5%

Place of birth
According to the 2006–2008 American Community Survey (ACS), 81.3% of Marin County's residents were born in the United States. Approximately 80.0% of the county's residents were born in one of the fifty states or born abroad to American parents.

Foreign-born individuals made up the remaining 18.7% of the population. Latin America was the most common birthplace of foreign-born residents; those born in Latin America made up the plurality (42.2%) of Marin County's foreign population. Individuals born in Europe were the second largest foreign-born group; they made up 25.3% of Marin County's foreign population. Immigrants from Asia made up 23.7% of the county's foreign population. Those born in other parts of North America and Africa made up 3.9% and 3.8% of the foreign-born populace respectively. Lastly, residents born in Oceania made up a mere 1.2% of Marin County's foreign population.

Source:

Language
According to the 2006–2008 ACS, English was the most commonly spoken language at home by residents over five years of age; those who spoke only English at home made up 77.1% of Marin County's residents. Speakers of non-English languages accounted for the remaining 22.9% of the population. Speakers of Spanish made up 11.7% of the county's residents, while speakers of other Indo-European languages made up 7.1% of the populace. Speakers of Asian languages and indigenous languages of the Pacific islands made up 3.4% of the population. The remaining 0.7% spoke other languages.
Source:

Ancestry
According to the 2007–2009 ACS, there were 16 ancestries in Marin County that made up over 0.9% of its population each. The 16 ancestries are listed below:

 Irish: 16.2%
 German: 15.4%
 English: 13.5%
 Italian: 9.1%
 Russian: 3.6%
 Scottish: 3.5%
 French: 3.4%
 Swedish: 2.6%
 Polish: 2.3%
 Scotch-Irish: 2.3%
 American: 2.3%
 Norwegian: 2.1%
 Dutch: 1.5%
 Portuguese: 1.3%
 Danish: 1.3%
 Swiss: 0.9%

Income

The median income for a household in the county was $71,306 and the median income for a family was $88,934. As of 2007, these figures had risen to $83,732 and $104,750.

In May 2010, the county had the lowest unemployment rate in California. According to the U.S. Bureau of Labor Statistics, however, in July 2010, Marin's unemployment rate rose to 8.3%.

Government and infrastructure

San Quentin State Prison of the California Department of Corrections and Rehabilitation is in the county. San Quentin houses the male death row and the execution chamber of California.

Politics
From 2008 to 2012, Huffman represented Marin County in the California State Assembly.

In the California State Legislature, Marin County is in:

 
 .

Voter registration statistics

Cities by population and voter registration

Overview
For most of the 20th century, Marin County was a Republican stronghold in presidential elections. From 1880 until 1984, the only Democrats to win there were Franklin Roosevelt and Lyndon Johnson. However, the brand of Republicanism prevailing in Marin County was historically a moderate one. Like most of the historically Republican suburbs of the Bay Area, it became friendlier to Democrats as the demographics of the area changed and the national party embraced social and religious conservatism. In 1984, it very narrowly voted for Walter Mondale and has supported the Democratic candidate in every presidential election since then. Out of all California counties, only San Francisco County voted more Democratic in the 2020 presidential election.

 
 
 
 
 
 
 
 
 
 
 
 
 
 
 
 
 
 
 
 
 
 
 
 
 
 
 
 
 
 
 
 

Marin has voted for many gubernatorial candidates who went on to become high-profile national figures, including Richard Nixon, Ronald Reagan, Jerry Brown, and Dianne Feinstein.

On November 4, 2008, the citizens of Marin County voted strongly against Proposition 8, a constitutional amendment which eliminated the right of same-sex couples to marry, by a 75.1 percent to 24.9 percent margin. The official tally was 103,341 against and 34,324 in favor. Only San Francisco County voted against the measure by a wider margin (75.2% against).

According to the California Secretary of State, as of February 10, 2019, Marin County has 161,870 registered voters. Of those, 89,526 (55.31%) are registered Democrats, 23,380 (14.44%) are registered Republicans, 7,020 (4.35%) are registered with other political parties, and 41,908 (25.89%) have declined to state a political party. Democrats hold wide voter-registration majorities in all political subdivisions in Marin County. Democrats' largest registration advantage in Marin is in the town of Fairfax, wherein there are only 344 Republicans (6.1%) out of 5,678 total voters compared to 3,758 Democrats (66.2%) and 1,276 voters who have declined to state a political party (22.5%).

The last time Marin elected a Republican to represent them in the United States House of Representatives was William S. Mailliard in 1972. The last competitive race for the U.S. House of Representatives in Marin was in 1982 when Barbara Boxer was first elected. The longest serving representative of Marin in congress was Clarence F. Lea who served in the House from 1917 to 1949.

Due to the rapidly expanding nature of California's population, Marin's congressional district has changed numerous times over the decades. The county has been part of the 2nd congressional district of California since 2012; the only other time it was part of the 2nd district was 1902–12. It has also been part of the 1st (1894–1902 and 1912–66), 3rd (1864–94), 5th (1974–82), and the 6th (1972–74 and 1982–2012). The only time the county has not been in a single congressional district was between 1966 and 1972, when it was divided between the northern half in the 1st district and the southern half in the 6th district.

"Marin County hot-tubber" 
In 2002, former U.S. President George H. W. Bush denounced convicted American Taliban associate John Walker Lindh as "some misguided Marin County hot-tubber," as a reference to the county's liberal, "hippie" political culture, mispronouncing "Marin" as he did so. Outraged by the label, some local residents wrote scathing letters to the Marin Independent Journal, complaining of Bush's remarks. In response, Bush wrote a letter to readers in the same newspaper, admitting regret and promising to not use the phrases Marin County and hot tub "in the same sentence again."

Transportation

Major highways
  Interstate 580
  U.S. Route 101 (Redwood Highway)
  State Route 1
  State Route 37
  State Route 131 (Tiburon Boulevard)

Public transportation

Golden Gate Transit provides service primarily along the U.S. 101 corridor, serving cities in Marin County, as well as San Francisco and Sonoma County. Service is also provided to Contra Costa County via the Richmond-San Rafael Bridge. Ferries to San Francisco operate from Larkspur, Sausalito and Tiburon. Ferry service from Tiburon is provided by Golden Gate Ferry, Blue and Gold Fleet and by the Angel Island Ferry.

Local bus routes within Marin County are operated by Golden Gate Transit under contract with Marin Transit. Marin Transit also operates the West Marin Stage, serving communities in the western, rural areas of Marin County, the Muir Woods Shuttle, and 6 community shuttle routes.

The Sonoma–Marin Area Rail Transit system, which began service in August 2017, is a commuter rail service and bicycle-pedestrian pathway serving Sonoma and Marin counties.  service operates from Sonoma County Airport to six stations in Marin ending near Larkspur Landing. Later phases of construction will extend service further north to Cloverdale in Sonoma County.

The Marin Airporter offers scheduled bus service to and from Marin County and the San Francisco Airport.

Greyhound Lines buses service San Rafael.

Airports
Marin County Airport or Gnoss Field (ICAO: KDVO) is a general aviation airport operated by the County Department of Public Works. The nearest airports with commercial flights are San Francisco International Airport and Oakland International Airport, as well as Charles M. Schulz - Sonoma County Airport north of Marin County.

Education

Marin County Free Library is the county library system. It is headquartered in San Rafael. In addition, the Belvedere-Tiburon Library is in Tiburon.

College of Marin, established in 1926, includes two campuses. The Kentfield Campus is in Kentfield; the Indian Valley Campus is in Novato. The college offers more than 40 degree programs leading to an Associate of Arts or Associate of Science degree and over 20 Certificates of Achievement with various specialties. The College serves approximately 9,000 students each term. Approximately 5,700 students enroll in COM's credit program. About 1,300 students enroll in English as a Second Language classes. Approximately 1,900 enroll in community education classes. The College employs about 300 permanent staff and faculty and many part-time employees.

Marin is also home to Dominican University of California, in San Rafael. Founded as a women's college in 1890 by the Dominican Sisters of San Rafael, it became the first Catholic institution in California to offer bachelor's degrees to women. The college became fully coeducational in 1971, and in 2000 became an independent liberal-arts university, changing from its original name of Dominican College of San Rafael. There are about 1,400 undergraduate and 500 graduate students.

Culture
 Marin Museum of the American Indian
 Marin Museum of Contemporary Art
 Marin Museum of Bicycling
 Museum of International Propaganda
 The Space Station Museum

Economy
As of 2011, the largest private-sector employers in Marin County were:

 Kaiser Permanente (1,803 full-time employees in Marin County)
 Marin General Hospital (1,100)
 Fireman's Fund Insurance Company (950)
 Autodesk (878)
 BioMarin Pharmaceutical (871)
 Safeway Inc. (841)
 Comcast (620)
 Macy's (380)
 Bradley Real Estate (376)
 MHN (350)
 Dominican University of California (346)
 Wells Fargo (332)
 Kentfield Rehabilitation and Specialty Hospital (315)
 Community Action Marin (268)
 Costco (260)
 Brayton Purcell (256)
 CVS/pharmacy (232)
 Novato Community Hospital (227)
 Lucasfilm (220)
 FICO (200+)
 Mollie Stone's Markets (190)
 Guide Dogs for the Blind (189)
 W. Bradley Electric (185)
 Bank of Marin (178)
 Cagwin & Dorward (175)
 Ghilotti Bros. (145)
 West Bay Builders (133)
 Villa Marin (130)

The 2013 gross value of all agricultural production in Marin County was about $84 million; of this, more than $63 million was from the sale of livestock and their products (milk, eggs, wool, etc.). Only 175 acres were planted to grapes.

As of the fourth quarter 2021, Marin County had a median home value of $1,090,583, an increase of 11% from the prior year.

Media
Marin County receives media from the rest of the Bay Area.

The county also has several media outlets that serve the local community:
 Marin Magazine, a monthly lifestyle magazine with headquarters in Sausalito.
 Marin Independent Journal, a daily newspaper with headquarters in San Rafael.
 Pacific Sun, a free weekly distributed throughout the county.
 Novato Advance, a weekly newspaper that serves Marin's second-largest city.
 The Point Reyes Light, a weekly newspaper.
 KWMR radio, West Marin Radio, in Point Reyes.
 Channel 26, public-access television cable TV in Marin.
 Marin Local Music, Music listings for Marin's Restaurants & Venues who host live music.
San Francisco Examiner, Rick Marianetti, Marin County Culture & Events.
The Patch, a local newspaper that serves Mill Valley, Marin's third-largest city.

Communities

Cities and towns

 Belvedere
 Corte Madera
 Fairfax
 Larkspur
 Mill Valley
 Novato
 Ross
 San Anselmo
 San Rafael
 Sausalito
 Tiburon

Census-designated places

 Alto
 Black Point-Green Point
 Bolinas
 Dillon Beach
 Inverness
 Kentfield
 Lagunitas-Forest Knolls
 Lucas Valley-Marinwood
 Marin City
 Muir Beach
 Nicasio
 Point Reyes Station
 San Geronimo
 Santa Venetia
 Sleepy Hollow
 Stinson Beach
 Strawberry
 Tamalpais-Homestead Valley
 Tomales
 Woodacre

Unincorporated communities

 Bel Marin Keys
 Burdell
 California Park
 Dogtown
 Fallon
 Greenbrae
 Hamlet
 Ignacio
 Inverness Park
 Las Gallinas
 Los Ranchitos
 Marconi
 Marshall
 Olema
 Paradise Cay
 San Quentin
 Shafter
 Tocaloma

Population ranking

The population ranking of the following table is based on the 2010 census of Marin County.

† county seat

In popular culture
 The song "Moon Over Marin" by hardcore punk band Dead Kennedys satirically depicts the pollution in Marin County..
 The 1954 science fiction novel The Body Snatchers is set in Marin County.

See also

 Gnoss Field
 Harkleroad wind turbine
 List of California counties
 List of people from Marin County, California
 List of school districts in Marin County, California
 National Register of Historic Places listings in Marin County, California
 Skywalker Sound, a division of Lucasfilm in Marin County
 I Want It All Now!

Notes

References

External links 

 
 Hiking trails in Marin County

 
Marin
Marin
Counties in the San Francisco Bay Area
1850 establishments in California
Populated places established in 1850